Jokihat Assembly constituency is an assembly constituency in Araria district in the Indian state of Bihar. In 2017 Bihar Flood affected area.

Overview
As per Delimitation of Parliamentary and Assembly constituencies Order, 2008, No 50 Jokihat Assembly constituency is composed of the following: Jokihat community development block;  Barahkumba, Bhikha, Nakta Khurd, Pakri, Pechaili, Ramnagar, Sohandar, Suksaina, Majlispur, Kujri and Miyanpur gram panchayats of Palasi CD Block.

Jokihat Assembly constituency is part of No 9 Araria (Lok Sabha constituency) (SC).

Members of Legislative Assembly 

^-bypoll

Election results

2020

2015
Janata Dal (United) had won the seat in 2015.

2010
In the November 2010 state assembly elections, Sarfaraz Alam of JD(U) won the Jokihat assembly seat, defeating his nearest rival Kaushar Ziya, Independent. Contests in most years were multi cornered but only winners and runners up are being mentioned.

2005
Manzar Alam of JD(U) defeated  Alam representing RJD in October 2005 and February 2005.

2000
Sarfraz Alam of RJD defeated Manzar Alam of JD(U) in 2000. Taslimuddin of SP defeated Bhoop Narayan Yadav, Independent, in 1995. Moidur Rahman of Congress defeated Bhoop Narayan Yadav, Independent, in 1990. Taslimuddin of JP defeated Moidur Rahman of Congress in 1985. Moidur Rahman of Congress defeated Jahoruddin, Independent, in 1980. Taslimuddin of JP defeated Moidur Rahman of Congress in 1977.

References

External links
 

Assembly constituencies of Bihar
Politics of Araria district